General elections were held in Azad Kashmir in 1996 to elect the members of sixth assembly of Azad Kashmir.

References

Elections in Azad Kashmir
1996 elections in Pakistan